Kazimierzów  is a village in the administrative district of Gmina Stoczek, within Węgrów County, Masovian Voivodeship, in east-central Poland.

The village has a population of 40.

References

Villages in Węgrów County